The 1994 Giro d'Italia was the 77th edition of the Giro d'Italia, one of cycling's Grand Tours. The Giro began in Bologna, with a flat stage on 22 May, and Stage 11 occurred on 1 June with a stage to Bibione. The race finished in Milan on 12 June.

Stage 1a
22 May 1994 — Bologna to Bologna,

Stage 1b
22 May 1994 — Bologna,  (ITT)

Stage 2
23 May 1994 — Bologna to Osimo,

Stage 3
24 May 1994 — Osimo to Loreto Aprutino,

Stage 4
25 May 1994 — Montesilvano to Campitello Matese,

Stage 5
26 May 1994 — Campobasso to Melfi,

Stage 6
27 May 1994 — Potenza to Caserta,

Stage 7
28 May 1994 — Fiuggi to Fiuggi,

Stage 8
29 May 1994 — Grosseto to Follonica,  (ITT)

Stage 9
30 May 1994 — Castiglione della Pescaia to Pontedera,

Stage 10
31 May 1994 — Marostica to Marostica,

Stage 11
1 June 1994 — Marostica to Bibione,

References

1994 Giro d'Italia
Giro d'Italia stages